Alluna is a genus of acoels belonging to the family Isodiametridae.

The species of this genus are found in Great Britain.

Species:
 Alluna sublitoralis Faubel & Regier, 1983

References

Acoelomorphs